A. P. Carter Store is a historic general store museum located at Maces Spring, Scott County, Virginia. It was built in 1945, and is a one-story, frame building with a cross-gable roof. The store is most notable for its association with the Carter Family, a traditional American folk music group that recorded between 1927 and 1956.  It was the residence and small store operated by former country music artist A.P. Carter (1891–1960).

It was listed on the National Register of Historic Places in 1985. It is now open weekly before concerts as a museum operated by the Carter Family Fold.

References

Cash–Carter family
Commercial buildings on the National Register of Historic Places in Virginia
Commercial buildings completed in 1945
Buildings and structures in Scott County, Virginia
National Register of Historic Places in Scott County, Virginia
1945 establishments in Virginia